Ramonda is a subgenus of flies in the family Tachinidae.

Species
Periscepsia barbata Mesnil, 1963
Periscepsia cinerosa (Coquillett, 1902)
Periscepsia clesides (Walker, 1849)
Periscepsia cleui (Herting, 1980)
Periscepsia delphinensis (Villeneuve, 1922)
Periscepsia helymus (Walker, 1849)
Periscepsia jugorum (Villeneuve, 1928)
Periscepsia labradorensis (Brooks, 1945)
Periscepsia laevigata (Wulp, 1890)
Periscepsia latifrons (Zetterstedt, 1844)
Periscepsia plorans (Rondani, 1861)
Periscepsia polita (Brooks, 1945)
Periscepsia prunaria (Rondani, 1861)
Periscepsia prunicia (Herting, 1969)
Periscepsia ringdahl (Villeneuve, 1922)
Periscepsia rohweri (Townsend, 1915)
Periscepsia spathulata (Fallén, 1820)
Periscepsia zarema Richter, 1976

References

Diptera of Europe
Diptera of Asia
Dexiinae
Insect subgenera
Taxa named by Jean-Baptiste Robineau-Desvoidy